Henry Conwell Wood (July 1840 -18 June 1926) was a Member of the Queensland Legislative Council.

Early life 
Wood was born in Bellary, India, to Herbert Wood and his wife, Maria-Louisa (née Conwell) and was educated at Cheltenham College.

Pastoral life 
Wood arrived in Queensland around 1861 and entered into partnership with John McConnel to take up Durundur Station, near Woodford. Wood imported the first Hereford cattle, which to be a successful breed in Queensland.

Public life 
Wood was appointed to the Queensland Legislative Council in April 1886 and resigned in December 1902. He had strong political views, and made his presence felt in the chamber.

He was Secretary of the Queensland National Association and a member of the Caboolture Divisional Board.

Personal life 
In June 1888 Wood married Margaret Ann Mason in Brisbane. 

Wood died on 18 June 1926 aged 86 years, He was buried in Woodford Cemetery.

Legacy 
The town of Woodford was named in his honour.

References

Members of the Queensland Legislative Council
1840 births
1926 deaths
British people in colonial India